Pentagioi is a mountain village in the municipal unit of Vardousia, northwestern Phocis, Greece. It is famous as the home town of Greek folk heroine Maria "Pentagiotissa".  In 2011 its population was 246.

Population

External links
 Pentagioi GTP Travel Pages

See also

List of settlements in Phocis

References

Populated places in Phocis